Dzmitry Turlin (born 8 September 1985) is a Belarusian former  professional footballer.

Career
Turlin appeared in eight matches in the preliminary rounds of the 2010–11 UEFA Europa League, including the playoff round against Villarreal.

References

External links

1985 births
Living people
People from Babruysk
Sportspeople from Mogilev Region
Belarusian footballers
Association football midfielders
FC Kommunalnik Slonim players
FC Dnepr Rogachev players
FC Belshina Bobruisk players
FC Dnepr Mogilev players
FC Gorodeya players
FC Khimik Svetlogorsk players
FC Naftan Novopolotsk players